Hiirenvesi is a medium-sized lake of eastern Finland. It is located in the Joensuu in the North Karelia region. The lake is part of Vuoksi basin in eastern Finland, that drains into the Lake Ladoga, which in turn is part of the Neva River basin in Russia.

See also
List of lakes in Finland

References

LHiirenvesi
Lakes of Joensuu